Chickenfoot is the debut studio album by the American hard rock band of the same name, released on June 5, 2009 in Europe and the US. The first pressing of the album was packaged with exclusive "heat sensitive" artwork that revealed an image when touched or exposed to heat above 84 degrees Fahrenheit.

On March 20, 2009, the band released two songs, "Soap on a Rope" and "Down the Drain" on their official website. The band's first single, "Oh Yeah", was released to radio stations nationwide, as well as on their official website, on April 13, 2009.

On October 7, 2009, the official Chickenfoot website revealed that the album had been certified Gold.

A deluxe edition with a DVD was released in the UK on October 26, 2009 and the US, exclusively at Best Buy stores, on November 1, 2009.

On October 16, 2012 the album was re-released as a double disc with 5 bonus tracks on the second disc. The release was due to the original label going out of business and the album being discontinued.

Recording
Regarding producer Andy Johns, bassist Michael Anthony states:

Artwork
On current pressings of the album, the front and back covers are printed with heat sensitive ink that changes appearance above and below 84 degrees Fahrenheit (approximately 29 degrees Celsius). When below 84 degrees (29 °C) it appears only a white Chickenfoot logo (which is not printed in heat sensitive ink) on a black background. When above 84 degrees (29 °C) it is the logo with four square zones with each band member in each one.

Reception

Track listing

Personnel
Adapted from the Chickenfoot liner notes.

Band
Sammy Hagar – lead vocals, rhythm guitar
Joe Satriani – lead guitar, keyboards
Michael Anthony – bass, backing vocals
Chad Smith – drums, percussion

Recording personnel
Andy Johns – producer, recording
Bob Daspit – recording
Dann Michael Thompson – recording, recording assistant, digital editing
Mike Fraser – recording, mixing
Judy Kirschner – recording assistant
John Cuniberti – recording assistant
Jamie Durr – recording assistant
Eric Mosher – mixing assistant, digital editing
Andre Zweers – digital editing
Bernie Grundman – mastering

Artwork
Todd Gallopo – art direction and design
Bryan Adams – photography
Jon Luini – digital strategy and video production

Chart positions

Weekly charts

Year-end charts

Certifications

Notes

References

External links
 Chickenfoot at Discogs
 Chickenfoot at Metacritic

2009 debut albums
Albums produced by Andy Johns
Chickenfoot albums